Philip David Warren (1851–?)  was the 12th Surveyor General of Ceylon.

Warren was educated at Norwich Grammar School. He was appointed in 1904, succeeding F. H. Grinlinton, and held the office until 1910. He was appointed CMG in the 1908 Birthday Honours and succeeded by R. S. Templeton.

References

1851 births
W
Ceylonese Companions of the Order of St Michael and St George
Year of death missing